Cultural Sociology is a peer-reviewed academic journal published jointly by the British Sociological Association and SAGE Publications. The journal includes sociological analysis of culture from a range of theoretical and methodological positions, and from a variety of national contexts. Cultural Sociology publishes sociologically-informed work concerned with cultural processes and artifacts, broadly defined. 

Although focused on sociological contributions to cultural analysis, articles include dialogue between sociology and other cognate fields such as cultural studies, gender studies, postcolonial studies, art history, history, literary and film studies, and human geography.

Abstracting and indexing 
Cultural Sociology is abstracted and indexed in the Social Sciences Citation Index. According to the Journal Citation Reports, the journal has a 2019 impact factor of 1.792, ranking it 84 out of 149 journals in the category "Sociology".

References

External links 
 

Sociology journals
SAGE Publishing academic journals
Publications established in 2007
English-language journals
Triannual journals
2007 establishments in the United Kingdom
British Sociological Association